Here Comes the Light is the debut solo album by Canadian singer-songwriter Andrew Rodriguez, following his decision to retire his previous band Bodega. The album was released in 2007 on The Baudelaire Label.

The album's lead single, "Astonished Heart", has received airplay on CBC Radio 3. Guest musicians on the album include Angela Desveaux and members of Stars.

Track listing
 Intro
 Astonished Heart
 The Man Who Never Knows
 Dreaming of It
 Coconuts
 Breakfast
 Come on In
 What I Done
 Good Bad Kids
 Bring Yourself Up
 Warm Hearts on Ice
 Here Comes the Light
 Only Human

References 

2007 debut albums
Andrew Rodriguez (singer-songwriter) albums